Edder Gerardo Delgado Zerón (born 20 November 1986) is a Honduran international footballer who currently plays as a midfielder for Real España in the Honduras National League.

Club career
Nicknamed Camello, Delgado has so far spent his entire professional career at Real Espana, making his debut in September 2007.

He is rumoured to join Seattle Sounders FC after the Sounders sent scouts over to Honduras.

International career
Delgado was part of the Honduras squad at the 2008 Summer Olympics.

He made his senior debut in a June 2009 friendly match against Haiti and has, as of December 2012, earned a total of 18 caps, scoring no goals. He has represented his country in 2 FIFA World Cup qualification matches and played at the 2011 CONCACAF Gold Cup.

References

External links
 Soccerway Profile
 
 

1986 births
Living people
People from Cortés Department
Association football midfielders
Honduran footballers
Honduras international footballers
Footballers at the 2008 Summer Olympics
Olympic footballers of Honduras
2011 CONCACAF Gold Cup players
2013 CONCACAF Gold Cup players
2014 FIFA World Cup players
Real C.D. España players
Liga Nacional de Fútbol Profesional de Honduras players
2014 Copa Centroamericana players